Shaolin (also known title as The New Shaolin Temple) is a 2011 Hong Kong - Chinese martial arts film directed by Benny Chan, who also produced with Albert Lee. It stars Andy Lau, Nicholas Tse, Fan Bingbing, Wu Jing, Yu Shaoqun, Xing Yu with a special appearance by Jackie Chan. The film's story is about a ruthless warlord who seeks refuge and redemption at Shaolin Temple after his second-in-command betrays him. The film was also released in Mandarin and Cantonese languages and was a commercial success.

Plot
The film is set in Dengfeng, Henan during the warlord era of early Republican China. Hou Jie, a ruthless warlord, defeats a rival, Huo Long, and seizes control of Dengfeng. Huo Long flees to Shaolin Temple to hide, but Hou Jie appears and shoots him after tricking him into giving up his treasure map. Hou Jie ridicules the Shaolin monks before leaving.

Feeling that his sworn brother, Song Hu, is taking advantage of him, Hou sets a trap for Song in a restaurant under the guise of agreeing to his daughter's engagement to Song's son. Meanwhile, Hou's deputy, Cao Man, ambitious and feeling used by Hou, decides to betray his superior. During the dinner, Song states his intention to retire and cede everything to Hou, and then suddenly receives a tip-off that Hou is planning to kill him. In rage and embarrassment, Hou fatally wounds Song. Both families are then attacked by Cao's assassins. Despite being shot by Hou, Song saves him with a warning, allowing him to escape, and then dies. While fleeing, Hou's wife and daughter are separated. Hou's wife is rescued by some Shaolin monks who were stealing rice from the military granary to help refugees living at the temple. Hou escapes with his daughter, who is severely injured after they fall off a cliff. In desperation, he brings her to Shaolin, begging the monks to save her life. Their efforts were in vain however, and she dies of her injuries. Hou's wife blames him for the death of their daughter and leaves him. Hou attacks the monks in anger but is quickly subdued.

Hou wanders in shock near Shaolin until he meets the cook Wudao, who provides him food and shelter after he was stuck in a pit for many days. Hou feels guilty for his past misdeeds and decides to become a monk and atone for his sins. During his stay in Shaolin, he gradually learns Shaolin's principles through study and martial arts, reforms, and finds peace. Hou later learns from the refugees that Cao has been recruiting male refugees to unearth relics under the pretext of hiring them to build a railway, and that Cao intends to kill them to silence them once their job is done. Hou intimidates the guards burying recent victims, then loads the corpses in a cart and drag it to the temple gate, where villagers and refugees identify their missing loved ones.

After Cao learns that Hou is still alive, he leads his soldiers to the temple to capture him. Hou volunteers to go with Cao so he can distract him while the monks break into Cao's base to save the imprisoned labourers. Hou is reunited with his wife and escapes with her when the rescue plan succeeds. Hou's senior, Jingneng, is brutally killed by Cao while covering his juniors' escape. Upon returning to Shaolin Temple, the monks decide that they need to evacuate in order to avoid further trouble. Wudao leads the refugees away while Hou and the other monks remain behind to defend the temple and buy time. Cao arrives with his troops and attacks Shaolin. At the same time, the foreigners find they have been cheated and decide to silence Cao and the entire Shaolin community. They bombard Shaolin with artillery, killing many of the monks and Cao's soldiers. Hou defeats Cao in a fight but eventually sacrifices himself to save Cao from being crushed by a falling beam. He falls into the Buddha statue's palm and dies peacefully, leaving Cao feeling guilty. The surviving monks kill the foreigners and stop the bombardment. Meanwhile, the refugees, fleeing on a mountainside, cry as they look down at the temple in ruins. Wudao tells them the Shaolin spirit will continue to live in them even though the temple has been destroyed.

Before the evacuation of the temple, Hou had met his wife for the last time. Repenting for his past, he gave the urn containing his daughter's cremated ashes to his wife. She forgave him for his past and accepted the fact she could no longer be with him, even though she prefers his present self to his former self. Hou refused to leave Shaolin and stayed behind to defend it and cover the refugees' escape. Admitting that Cao's evil actions stems from his own past misdeeds, Hou stated it was solely his responsibility to guide Cao to the correct path.

Cast
 Andy Lau as Hou Jie (侯傑), a warlord.
 Nicholas Tse as Cao Man (曹蠻), Hou Jie's second-in-command.
 Jackie Chan as Wudao (悟道), the Shaolin cook monk.
 Fan Bingbing as Yan Xi (顏夕), Hou Jie's wife.
 Wu Jing as Jingneng (淨能), Hou Jie's oldest senior.
 Xing Yu as Jingkong (淨空), Hou Jie's second senior.
 Yu Shaoqun as Jinghai (淨海), Hou Jie's third senior and a friend of Jingkong.
 Yu Hai as the Shaolin abbot
 Michelle Bai as Tien'er (甜兒), a singer.
 Shimada Runa as Hou Shengnan (侯勝男), Hou Jie's daughter.
 Shi Xiaohong as Song Hu (宋虎), Hou Jie's sworn brother.
 Liang Jingke as Song Hu's wife
 Hung Yan-yan as Suoxiangtu (索降圖), a martial arts expert working for Cao Man.
 Chen Zhihui as Huo Long (霍龍), a rival warlord.

Theme song
The theme song, "Wu" (悟; roughly translates to "awaken" or "enlighten"), was composed by Chinese composer Q. luv, with Andy Lau performing the song and providing the lyrics.

Production
Filming started in October 2009 with a ceremony held in Shaolin Monastery. News first spread of the project when the film's co-star Jackie Chan announced on his official website that he was involved with the project but was not able to talk about it due to contract restrictions.

Chan and his crew built their own "Shaolin Temple" in Zhejiang that cost 10 million yuan (US$1.47 million) to avoid damaging the actual temple. The cast members shaved their heads bald for filming, whereas Chan, who wore a hat, shaved around his head where his hair was sticking out.

Andy Lau's left hand was injured while he was filming a fight scene.

Release
Shaolin was originally slated for a late 2010 release. The film was released in China on 19 January 2011 and in Hong Kong on 27 January. Shaolin premiered as number one in the Hong Kong box office, grossing US$592,046 during its first week. The film also premiered at number one in the Thai and Singaporean box offices during opening week. The film also went on to break the box office record in Malaysia.

Reception
Shaolin holds a 74% "fresh" rating on Rotten Tomatoes based on 27 reviews.

Awards and nominations

See also
 Shaolin Temple (1982 film)

References

External links
 
 
 
 Shaolin 2011 Movie Review (BY AMP)

2011 films
2011 martial arts films
2010s Cantonese-language films
Chinese martial arts films
Chinese New Year films
Films directed by Benny Chan
Films set in Henan
Films set in the 1920s
Films set in the Republic of China (1912–1949)
Films with screenplays by Alan Yuen
Hong Kong martial arts films
Kung fu films
Shaolin Temple in film
Variance Films films
Wushu films
2010s Mandarin-language films
2010s Hong Kong films